"Love You Better" is a song from English indie rock band The Maccabees, released as the first single from their second album Wall of Arms, peaking at number 6 in the UK.

The song first received airplay on 16 March 2009 on Radio 1 by DJ Steve Lamacq.

Music video
The music video for the song features the band playing the song amongst blurry, colourful backgrounds.

Charts

References

2009 songs
2009 singles
The Maccabees (band) songs
Fiction Records singles